Halle Butler (born 1985 or 1986) is an American author. She grew up in Bloomington, Illinois and lives in Chicago. After co-writing two independent films, Butler published her first novel, Jillian in 2015. Her second novel, The New Me was released in 2019. Butler was recognised as one of Granta’s Best of Young American Novelists and honored as one of the National Book Foundation's 5 Under 35.

Early life and education
Originally from Bloomington, Illinois, Butler graduated with a BFA from the School of the Art Institute of Chicago in 2008. As of 2017, Butler was living in Chicago.

Career
Whilst working in a succession of menial jobs, Halle Butler co-wrote two independent films, Crimes against Humanity (2014) and Neighborhood Food Drive (2017). She released her first novel Jillian in 2015. The plot concerns the obsession of 24-year-old Megan with her 35-year-old co-worker Jillian. Butler published her second novel The New Me in 2019. It follows a temporary worker called Millie as she goes from job to job. Writing in The Guardian Rhiannon Lucy Cosslett called it "depressing" and "bleakly funny". Writing for The New Yorker, Jia Tolentino described it as a "definitive work of millennial literature".

Published works
Jillian,  Curbside Splendor, 2015. 
The New Me, Penguin Books, 2019.

Awards and honors
Granta’s Best of Young American Novelists of 2017
National Book Foundation 5 Under 35 Honoree

References

Living people
Year of birth missing (living people)
People from Bloomington, Illinois
School of the Art Institute of Chicago alumni
21st-century American women writers
American fiction writers
American women novelists